Çamyayla can refer to:

 Çamyayla, Ayancık
 Çamyayla, Bolu
 Çamyayla, Bozüyük
 Çamyayla, Çanakkale